Alla Alexandrovna Kudryavtseva (born 3 November 1987) is a retired Russian tennis player.

Kudryavtseva won one singles title and nine doubles titles on the WTA Tour, as well as two singles titles and 15 doubles titles on the ITF Women's Circuit. On 4 October 2010, she reached her best singles ranking of world No. 56. On 8 September 2014, she peaked at No. 15 in the WTA doubles rankings. On 2 November 2021, Kudryavtseva announced on Instagram that she had retired from the sport.

Professional career

Early career
Kudryavtseva debuted on the WTA Tour at the 2004 Kremlin Cup, where she could not succeed beyond the qualifying rounds. In the following season, her best WTA Tour result was reaching the first rounds of the Nordea Nordic Light Open in Stockholm in singles and the Banka Koper Slovenia Open in doubles.

Her first major appearance was at the 2006 Australian Open, where she could not win a qualification round. The same result was seen at the other three Grand Slam tournaments. Among her more notable results in that season were reaching the singles quarterfinals of the Sunfeast Open in Kolkata, India, and the semifinals in doubles of the Tashkent Open, with Canadian Stéphanie Dubois.

2007–11: Steady progress
In 2007, Kudryavtseva qualified for main draw of the Australian Open, reaching the second round in singles and doubles. With Hsieh Su-wei she reached her first WTA final at the Sony Ericsson International in Bangalore, India, losing to a pair from Taiwan. At the French Open, Kudryavtseva qualified for the second Grand Slam in a row and reached the third round, beating Gisela Dulko in the second, and eventually losing to Maria Sharapova. Her best result in singles at a WTA tournament was reaching quarterfinals at Barcelona. At Wimbledon, Kudryavtseva earned first Grand Slam direct entry but drew the eventual champion Venus Williams and lost in three sets. Later that year in Kolkata, Kudryavtseva with Vania King won her first title.

In 2008, partnering with Anastasia Pavlyuchenkova, she reached the final at the Internazionali di Palermo, losing to Sara Errani and Nuria Llagostera Vives. She played alongside several doubles partners, including King and Vera Dushevina. In singles, Kudryavtseva fought her way through the fourth round of Wimbledon, defeating third-seeded Sharapova in the second round, which is to date her best result in a Grand Slam singles event.

In 2009, Kudryavtseva progressed in doubles in the next season, climbing with Ekaterina Makarova to the final of the Premier Mandatory China Open, eventually losing to Hsieh Su-wei and Peng Shuai. Kudryavtseva/Dushevina reached the quarterfinals of the Rogers Cup.

In 2010, the Russian two times in succession reached the finals in singles, becoming champion in Tashkent and before that runner-up in Guangzhou. As a result, she reached a career-high ranking of 56 and finished the year at No. 61 in the world in singles. With her new partner Anastasia Rodionova she also reached two finals in doubles, winning the UNICEF Open.

In the 2011 season, she and Olga Govortsova reached three WTA Tour finals at the Cellular South Cup, Aegon Classic and Citi Open, the first two of which they won.

Kudryavtseva and Makarova became quarterfinalists of the 2012 Australian Open, eventually losing to Errani/Vinci; this became her best result in a Grand Slam doubles tournament. However, her 2012 season was rather poor, eventually skipping the WTA Tour for ITF tournaments at season end.

2013: Breakthrough in doubles
The back and forth switching of ITF and WTA tournaments continued until showing with Rodionova significant results since late April. They won the Challenge Bell, and also reached the final of the Kremlin Cup. Furthermore, the two became semifinalists at the Premier 5 events Italian Open and Pan Pacific Open. Kudryavtseva returned to the top 50 in doubles as a result of her successful season.

2014
Kudryavtseva/Rodionova continued their successful partnership starting the year with a title at Brisbane. The second title came in February in Dubai, where they defeated Kops-Jones and Spears in the final. Their biggest Grand Slam result came at Wimbledon, where they lost in the quarterfinal against Babos/Mladenovic. They also reached the semifinals in Cincinnati and Beijing, the quarterfinals in Miami, Doha and Wuhan. Their last title of the season came at an international event in Tianjin, which also led them into the WTA Championships in Singapore.

In their debut Championships in Singapore appearing Kudryavtseva/Rodionova beat a fourth-seeded team of Makarova/Vesnina, 4–6, 6–2, [10–6]. In the semifinals, they were defeated by title defenders Hsieh Su-wei/Peng Shuai, 6–1, 6–4. As a consequence, Kudryavtseva pushed into the top 20 in doubles, reaching a career-high ranking of 15.

In addition to the success in doubles, Kudryavtseva qualified for nine singles events including three Grand Slam tournaments; Australian Open, French Open and Wimbledon. She was able to finish the year in the top 100 at No. 96 for the first time since 2010.

2015
Kudryavtseva started the season with a quarterfinal showing at Brisbane in singles defeating world No. 23, Karolína Plíšková, in the second round. She paired with Anastasia Pavlyuchenkova of Russia in hopes for Olympics and reached semifinals at Dubai, Charleston, Rome and Washington. They also reached quarterfinals of the US Open but fell one spot short of qualifying for the WTA Finals and went to Singapore as an alternate. Kudryavtseva finished the year at 170 in singles and 29 in doubles.

Performance timelines

Only main-draw results in WTA Tour, Grand Slam tournaments, Fed Cup and Olympic Games are included in win–loss records.

Singles

Doubles

Significant finals

WTA 1000 finals

Doubles: 1 (runner-up)

WTA career finals

Singles: 2 (1 title, 1 runner-up)

Doubles: 20 (9 titles, 11 runner-ups)

ITF Circuit finals

Singles: 10 (2 titles, 8 runner-ups)

Doubles: 19 (15 titles, 4 runner-ups)

Notes

References

External links

 
 
 
 
 

1987 births
Living people
Tennis players from Moscow
Russian female tennis players
Russian expatriates in the United States